Mark Sullivan may refer to:
 Mark J. Sullivan, director of the United States Secret Service, 2006–2013
 Mark Sullivan (cricketer) (born 1964), South African cricketer
 Mark Sullivan (wheelchair basketballer), New Zealand wheelchair basketballer in New Zealand men's national wheelchair basketball team
 Mark T. Sullivan (born 1958), American author of mystery and suspense novels
 Mark Sullivan (judge) (1911–2001), justice on the New Jersey Supreme Court, 1973–1981
 Mark Sullivan (public servant), former Secretary of the Australian Government Department of Veterans' Affairs
 Mark Sullivan, founder Snowboard Magazine
 Mark Sullivan, keyboardist for several California bands including Toiling Midgets
 Mark Sullivan, chief scientist for Eagle Eye Technologies, Inc, later SkyBitz
 Mark Sullivan (visual effects artist), Academy Award nominated visual effects artist
 Mark Sullivan (American football), American football coach
 Mark Sullivan (journalist) (1874-1952), American political commentator

See also
 Marc Sullivan (born 1958), baseball player